During the 2002–03 English football season, Leicester City F.C. competed in the Football League First Division after being relegated from the FA Premier League the previous season. Despite being placed into administration, Leicester managed to regain promotion to the Premier League.

Season summary
In October 2002, Leicester went into administration with debts of £30 million. Some of the reasons were the loss of TV money (ITV Digital, itself in administration, had promised money to First Division clubs for TV rights), the large wage bill, lower fees for players transferred to other clubs than expected and the £37 million cost of the new stadium. Manager Micky Adams was banned from the transfer market for most of the season, until the club was rescued by a takeover by a consortium led by former Leicester striker Gary Lineker. Adams guided Leicester to runners-up spot in Division One and automatic promotion back to the Premiership with 92 points. After several First Division clubs complained to the Football League, the Football League introduced a ruling that any club placed in administration would be deducted ten points.

Final league table

Results summary

Results by round

Results
Leicester City's score comes first

Legend

Football League First Division

FA Cup

League Cup

Squad

Left club during season

Transfers

In

Out

Transfers in:  £0
Transfers out:  £4,250,000
Total spending:  £4,250,000

References

Leicester City F.C. seasons
Leicester City